Olaj Johan Olsen (6 April 1851 – 16 June 1920) was a Norwegian jurist and politician.

He made a career as a civil servant in various government ministries. He was later promoted to serve as Minister of Justice and the Police and Minister of Finance and Customs in 1888 and 1889, member of the Council of State Division in Stockholm from 1896 to 1897 and Minister of the Interior from 1897 to 1898.

He was also County Governor of Nordre Bergenhus amt from 1889. In 1902 he left this post to become burgomaster of his hometown Bergen.

References

1851 births
1920 deaths
Government ministers of Norway
Politicians from Bergen
County governors of Norway
Ministers of Finance of Norway
Ministers of Justice of Norway